N'Tillit  is a rural commune and village in the Cercle of Gao in the Gao Region of south-eastern Mali. In the 2009 census the commune had a population of 22,100.

References

External links
.

Communes of Gao Region